Classic Pop is a bi-monthly British music magazine, which launched in October 2012. It was devised and founded by Ian Peel, who was also editor for the first 19 issues. Rik Flynn stepped in as editor until Issue 23 followed by current editor Steve Harnell.  Ian Peel remains involved as Founder & Editor-at-Large. 

Launched as a bi-monthly magazine by Anthem Publishing, Classic Pop had become a monthly magazine by the time Anthem temporarily paused publication of the title in April 2020 due to Covid-19. After a break of three months, which saw Anthem cease publication of sister magazine "Long Live Vinyl", Classic Pop returned as a bi-monthly publication with occasional special editions (such as "Synthpop Volume 2: Electric Dreams").

Its overriding philosophy is summed up on one of its occasional series, Five Decades of... which interviews and appraises the work of an influential musician or group who may have been constantly overlooked by other media but who are nonetheless influential and have been consistently active, releasing new music across the 1970s, 1980s, 1990s, 2000s and 2010s. Key Five Decades of... features have included Vince Clarke (Issue 10, pages 54–61), Duran Duran (Issue 1, pages 52–59), Simple Minds (Issue 2, pages 58–65) and Spandau Ballet (Issue 3, pages 50–57).

Classic Pop has also published special one-off editions commemorating the lives of David Bowie, Prince and Michael Jackson, as well as the careers of ABBA, Madonna, Paul McCartney and Elton John.

Regular sections

'Godfathers/Godmothers of Pop' 
One of the magazine's lead sections, every issue has profiled one or more influential musicians with an exclusive interview and induction into Classic Pop's Godmothers/Godfathers of Pop. The following artists have been bestowed the title:

Marc Almond (Issue 16, page 18–19), Adam Ant (Issue 19, page 17), Wally Badarou (Issue 12, page 19), Tom Bailey (Issue 4, page 19), Andy Bell (Issue 13, page 17), Blancmange (Issue 1, page 21), Thomas Dolby (Issue 23, page 33), Wolfgang Flür (Issue 20, page 17), Martin Fry (Issue 9, page 17), Glenn Gregory (Issue 3, page 19), Clare Grogan (Issue 12, page 17), Tony Hadley (Issue 6, page 19), Daryl Hall (Issue 16, page 21), Morten Harket (Issue 3, page 17), Nick Heyward (Issue 19, page 19), Peter Hook (Issue 5, page 19), Trevor Horn (Issue 10, page 17), Steve Jansen (Issue 23, page 35), Matt Johnson (Issue 18, page 17), Howard Jones (Issue 2, page 19), Gary Kemp (Issue 1, page 19), Nik Kershaw (Issue 1, page 23 and Issue 21, page 33), Mark King (Issue 11, page 17), Annie Lennox (Issue 4, page 17), Ron Mael (Issue 10, page 19), Phil Manzanera (Issue 22, page 19), Dieter Meier (Issue 7, page 19), Daniel Miller (Issue 20, page 19), Kylie Minogue (Issue 2, page 17), Giorgio Moroder (Issue 6, page 17), Yoko Ono (Issue 7, page 17), Andy Partridge (Issue 15, page 17), Kate Pierson (Issue 21, page 31), Nick Rhodes (Issue 5, page 17), Nile Rodgers (Issue 8, page 17), Shaun Ryder (Issue 18, page 19), Cathal Smyth (Issue 22, page 17), Lisa Stansfield (Issue 8, page 19), Susan Ann Sulley (Issue 15, page 19), Bernard Sumner (Issue 17, page 17), John Taylor (Issue 9, page 19), Tracey Thorn (Issue 17, page 19), Toyah (Issue 13, page 19), Midge Ure (Issue 11, page 19), Martyn Ware (Issue 14, page 17), Pete Waterman (Issue 14, page 19).

'Classic Album' 
Each edition of Classic Pop devotes five pages to an in-depth examination of the making of, and influence of, a definitive album of the pop genre.

Avalon – Roxy Music (Issue 17, pages 50–54)
Crash – The Human League (Issue 16, pages 64–68)
Dirk Wears White Sox – Adam and the Ants (Issue 9, pages 68–72)
Dare – The Human League (Issue 10, pages 70–74)
Fantastic – Wham! (Issue 5, pages 62–66)
Gentlemen Take Polaroids – Japan (Issue 3, pages 78–82)
Hounds of Love – Kate Bush (Issue 6, pages 72–76)
Hunting High And Low – A-Ha (Issue 8, pages 72–76)
The Innocents – Erasure (Issue 19, pages 58–62, 64)
Kylie – Kylie Minogue (Issue 14, pages 54–58)
The Lexicon of Love – ABC (Issue 1, pages 84–88)
Madonna – Madonna (Issue 2, pages 90–94)
True Blue – Madonna (Issue 23, pages 74–79)
Off the Wall – Michael Jackson (Issue 22, pages 62–66)
Once Upon A Time – Simple Minds (Issue 20, pages 54–59)
Pelican West – Haircut One Hundred (Issue 15, pages 64–68)
Purple Rain – Prince and the Revolution (Issue 4, pages 64–68)
Raw Like Sushi – Neneh Cherry (Issue 13, pages 60–64)
Rhythm Nation 1814 – Janet Jackson (Issue 12, pages 60–64)
Rio – Duran Duran (Issue 11, pages 66–70)
Screamadelica – Primal Scream (Issue 21, pages 60–64)
Spirit of Eden – Talk Talk (Issue 7, pages 68–72)

Guest Reviewers 
Since May 2014, the singles reviews section has been written by a special guest.  To date these have included:

Neil Arthur (Issue 22, page 94)
Sara Cox (Issue 11, page 94)
Carol Decker (Issue 20, page 92)
Dr Robert (Issue 23, page 90)
Sophie Ellis-Bextor (Issue 14, page 94)
Martin Fry (Issue 16, page 94)
Paul Heaton (Issue 12, page 90)
Billy Ray Martin (Issue 18, page 92)
Dieter Meier (Issue 13, page 90)
Chris Stein (Issue 15, page 94)
Nick Van Eede (Issue 21, page 92)
Tim Wheeler (Issue 19, page 92)
Jah Wobble (Issue 17, page 92)

'Lost & Found' 
Every issue of the magazine has included a column – most often written by Ian Peel or John Earls – examining and assessing a single or album that should be considered classic or influential with hindsight, but which has fallen off the radar of the media or public-at-large.  The following releases have been covered in this section:

Airhead – Funny How (Issue 18, page 16)
Bourgie Bourgie – Breaking Point (Issue 17, page 16)
Espiritu – Conquistador (Issue 7, page 14)
Engine Room – Your Kiss is a Weapon (Issue 9, page 14)
Eurythmics – 1984 – For the Love of Big Brother (Issue 2, page 14)
Frazier Chorus – Sue (Issue 4, page 14)
Gangway – Sitting in the Park (Issue 15, page 14)
Haircut One Hundred – Paint and Paint (Issue 13, page 14)
Information Society – What's On Your Mind (Pure Energy) (Issue 23, page 32)
Intaferon – Get Out of London (Issue 14, page 14)
Kaja – Crazy Peoples Right to Speak (Issue 16, page 16)
Mainframe – 5 Minutes (Issue 22, page 16)
Merrick & Tibbs – Call of the Wild (Issue 10, page 14)
Modern English – I Melt With You (Issue 21, page 30)
Neil – Neil's Heavy Concept Album (Issue 19, page 16)
Perils of Plastic – Ring a Ding Ding (Issue 6, page 14)
Person to Person – Stronger Than Reason (Issue 12, page 14)
Jon Pertwee – Who Is the Doctor? (Issue 8, page 14)
Shakatak – Drivin’ Hard (Issue 20, page 16)
Shriekback – Jam Science (Issue 3, page 16)
Sigue Sigue Sputnik – Hey Jayne Mansfield Superstar! (Issue 5, page 14)
The The – Soul Mining (Issue 1, page 12)
This Way Up – Feelin’ Good About It (Issue 11, page 14)

Occasional series

 'Labelled With Love' 

Classic Pop runs an occasional series of in-depth appraisals of influential record labels.  These have included:

British Electric Foundation (by Ian Peel, Issue 21, pages 76–80)
Chrysalis Records (by Pierre Perrone, Issue 8, pages 66–70)
Factory Records (by Mick Middles, Issue 9, pages 62–66)
4AD (by Wyndham Wallace, Issue 7, pages 62–66)
Mute Records (by Ian Peel, Issue 2, pages 84–88)
Postcard Records (by Graeme Thomson, Issue 11, pages 52–56)
PWL (by Mark Lindores, Issue 3, pages 72–76)
Sire Records (by Pierre Perrone, Issue 14, pages 72–76)
Some Bizzare (by John Earls, Issue 4, pages 58–62)
Stiff Records (by Ian Peel, Issue 5, pages 56–60)
Virgin Records (by Pierre Perrone, Issue 6, pages 66–70)
Zang Tuum Tumb (by Jon Andrews, Issue 1, pages 78–82)

 'The Story Behind the Song' 

For five issues in 2014, Classic Pop ran a series of interviews with songwriters describing the creative process behind some of their most well-known works.  The songs examined in this series were:Ai No Corrida (songwriter: Chaz Jankel, releasing artist: The Blockheads) – Issue 9, page 98Digging Your Scene (songwriter: Dr Robert, releasing artist: The Blow Monkeys) – Issue 12, page 98Glad It's All Over (songwriter and releasing artist: Captain Sensible) – Issue 11, page 99Just an Illusion (songwriter: Leee John, releasing artist: Imagination) – Issue 12, page 99We Close Our Eyes (songwriter: Peter Cox & Richard Drummie, releasing artist: Go West) – Issue 9, page 100Wishing (I Had a Photograph of You) (songwriter: Mike Score, releasing artist: A Flock of Seagulls) – Issue 13, page 93Wouldn’t It Be Good (songwriter and releasing artist: Nik Kershaw) – Issue 10, page 102

'On the Road With...'

A pictorial based on exclusive behind-the-scenes photos and commentary from a recent concert.  These have included Claudia Brücken's This Happened at Bush Hall, London (Issue 1, pages 106–107), The Christians' European Tour (Issue 2, pages 128–129), Thomas Dolby's Time Capsule Tour of the US (Issue 1, pages 104–105), Nick Heyward at Let's Rock the Moor! (Issue 4, pages 112–113), Let's Rock Festival (Issue 11, pages 90–91), Madness at The Queens' Diamond Jubilee Celebration Concert (Issue 1, pages 108–109),  Swing Out Sister at Billboard Live, Tokyo (Issue 3, pages 128–129), Then Jerico's Big Area Tour (Issue 2, pages 126–127).

 'Hit Songwords' 
The earlier issues of the magazine included the lyrics to a particular song. These were Deacon Blue – Chocolate Girl (Issue 4, page 12), The Farm – All Together Now (Issue 5, page 12), Frankie Goes To Hollywood – Two Tribes (Annihilation) (Issue 6, page 12), Spandau Ballet –  Gold (Issue 2, page 12), Squeeze – Cool for Cats'' (Issue 3, page 12).

References

External links
 

Magazines established in 2012
Monthly magazines published in the United Kingdom
Music magazines published in the United Kingdom